The Conveni 200X is a convenience store simulation game designed for the Xbox 360 system. The game was released on March 30, 2006, and was developed by Masterpiece and published by Hamster Corporation

References

External links
 Hamster official website
 Master Piece Official Site

2006 video games
Business simulation games
Video games developed in Japan
Xbox 360-only games
Xbox 360 games
Japan-exclusive video games
Hamster Corporation games
Single-player video games